Annales des Sciences Naturelles (Paris) was a scientific journal with botanical descriptions published in Paris. In a first series, thirty volumes were published in the years 1824-1833, under the name of Annales des sciences naturelles; comprenant la physiologie animale et végétale, l'anatomie comparée des deux règnes, zoologie, botanique, minéralogue et la géologie. Paris. After that, at least 8 follow-up series were issued under the names Annales des Sciences Naturelles; Botanique, ser. XXX, most of them comprising 20 volumes and in 10 years. See the table for details.

External links
Entry at tropicos.org catalogue
Entry ar International Plant Names Index

Volumes available at archive.org:
Series 5 — 1868: 9 * 1869:  10 * 11 * 12 1870-1871: 13 * 1872: 14 * 15 * 16 1873: 17 * 18 * 1874: 19 * 20 
Series 6 — 1875: 1 * 2 * 1876: 3 * 4 * 1878: 5 * 6 * 7 1879: 8 * 9 1880: 10 
Series 7 — 1892: 15 * 16 * 1893: 17 * 18 * 1894: 19 * 1895: 20 
Series 8 — 1895: 1 * 1896: 2 * 1897: 3 * 4  * 5 * 6 * 1898: 7 * 8 1899: 9 * 10 * 1900: 11 * 12 
Series 9 — 1911: 14 No 1,2,3 * 14 No 4,5,6

Notes

References

Zoology journals
Botany journals
Anatomy journals
1824 establishments
1937 disestablishments